Paulina Vega Dieppa (born 15 January 1993) is a Colombian television host, model and beauty queen crowned Miss Colombia 2013 and Miss Universe 2014. Vega is the second Miss Universe from Colombia.

Early life
Paulina Vega Dieppa was born in Barranquilla, Colombia to Laura Dieppa and cardiologist Rodolfo Vega Llama. She has seven brothers and sisters. Ms. Vega is of Spanish and French descent the granddaughter of Colombian tenor Gastón Vega and Miss Atlántico 1953 Elvira Castillo, also a distant cousin of Miss Colombia 2014 Ariadna Gutiérrez who placed first runner-up at Miss Universe 2015. Vega completed her elementary and high school education between Colegio Karl C. Parrish and the German School of Barranquilla during her years living in the Caribbean city, after moving to the capital where she finished her last years at Deutsche Schule Bogotá. She also studied Business Administration at the Pontifical Xavierian University.

Pageantry

Miss Colombia 2013
Paulina Vega Dieppa competed in Miss Colombia 2013 on November 11, 2013, held in Cartagena, representing the Atlántico Department, where she won the title of Miss Colombia, gaining the right to represent the country at Miss Universe 2014. She was crowned by the outgoing titleholder Lucia Aldana, Miss Colombia 2012. Vega became the eleventh Miss Atlantico to win that title since the Miss Colombia pageant began in 1934, the first Miss Atlantico to win Miss Universe, and the second Colombian to win Miss Universe after Luz Marina Zuluaga in 1958.

Miss Universe 2014
Miss Universe 2013, Gabriela Isler from Venezuela, crowned her as Miss Universe 2014 on January 25, 2015, in Doral, Florida, beating 87 contestants. She was the second Colombian in 56 years to win the Miss Universe crown after Miss Universe 1958 Luz Marina Zuluaga. Vega debuted the pageant's new crown as designed by Diamonds International Corporation, a Czech-based jeweler officially responsible for Miss Universe jewelry. Her prize package included cash, a year contract promoting Miss Universe, world travel, a rent-free luxury apartment in New York City, a gift bag stuffed with designer shoes, dresses, and beauty products, a US$100,000 stipend for a two-year course at the New York Film Academy, and free access to famous fashion houses and beauty parlors. Vega intends to spend her year-long reign traveling the world to lecture on humanitarian issues and to promote education regards HIV/AIDS. After her crowning, Paulina was interviewed by CNN en Español, ABC, Rendezvous with Miss Universe (Indonesia), Fox News, Univision, Caracol Televisión (Colombia), RCN TV (Colombia), Telemundo, Way Too Early with Thomas Roberts (MSNBC), Morning Joe (MSNBC), Today (NBC) and Live! with Kelly and Michael (ABC).

In early February, Vega attended Mercedes Benz-New York Fashion Week in New York City together with Miss USA 2014 and Miss Teen USA 2014. On February 17, 2015, Vega made an appearance on the season finale of The Celebrity Apprentice. On February 20, 2015, Vega visited Indonesia to attend the 19th annual Puteri Indonesia 2015 pageant. She assisted in the crowning of Puteri Indonesia 2015 (Miss Universe Indonesia). She also visited Jakarta and Surabaya where she filmed publicity for YOU•C1000 along with former Miss Universes Dayana Mendoza and Olivia Culpo in Bali.

In early March, Vega traveled to Doral, Florida, to attend the World Golf Championships at Trump National Doral Miami golf resort. On March 8, 2015, Vega became a public speaker at the Women's History Month Event 2015 in New York City. On March 11, 2015, Vega volunteered at GMHC, New York City, to learn about their services and critical issues of HIV and AIDS. In addition, she was interviewed on MSNBC in Out There with Thomas Roberts to discuss how she would work to raise awareness for HIV/AIDS in her new role. On March 19, 2015, Vega traveled to Nice, France. She was invited by SAGA Cosmetics to launch the 'Miss Universe Style Illuminate by CHI' haircare line. On March 22, 2015, Vega attended the CosmoProf Worldwide Beauty Show to launch the 'Miss Universe Style Illuminate by CHI' haircare line at Bologna, Italy. During the same week, she was also invited to launch the Yamamay for Miss Universe' 2015 Swimwear Collection at Milan. After her European trips, Vega visited Toronto, Canada, for the first time as it prepared for the 2015 Pan American Games.

On April 6, 2015, Vega attended the Jeffrey Fashion Cares 2015 at ArtBeam in New York City. On April 9, 2015, Vega emerged as the winner of Missosology's Timeless Beauty 2014 contest. On April 10, 2015, Vega attended AID FOR AIDS International to support National Youth HIV & AIDS Awareness Day. She is committed to fighting against HIV and AIDS, as well as providing support to children and young adults fighting this disease. On the same day, Vega attended the Colombian International Film Festival in New York. On April 13, 2015, Vega traveled to Santiago, Chile, where she was invited for a photoshoot with Falabella. On April 15, 2015, Vega became the godmother for the Latino Commission on AIDS. During the same event, she helped launch the 25th-anniversary campaign at Macy's Herald Square in New York City. On April 20, 2015, Vega traveled to Bogotá, Colombia, where she was officially revealed as the new face of Falabella. On April 27, 2015, Vega began her homecoming trip to Colombia, arriving in Bogotá. On April 28, 2015, Vega met the President of Colombia, Juan Manuel Santos, and his wife Clemencia Santos at the Presidential Palace for a welcoming ceremony. Vega was appointed as the ambassador to fight against child malnutrition. On April 29, 2015, Vega met the employees of Vogue Cosmetics Plant, the sponsor of Miss Universe in Colombia. She was the guest of honor at RCN TV where she met Colombia's first Miss Universe, Luz Marina Zuluaga. On April 30, 2015, Vega traveled to Cartagena where she met the board of directors of Miss Colombia. Also on April 30, Vega traveled to her hometown, Barranquilla. On May 1, 2015, Vega attended a welcoming event at Plaza de la Paz where she met the Mayor of Barranquilla, Ms. Elsa Noguera.

On May 1, 2015, Vega was chosen as one of the 50 most beautiful Hispanic celebrities by People en Español magazine. During the same day, Vega walked the red carpet at the People en Español 50 Most Beautiful 2015 Gala in New York City. On May 14, 2015, Vega attended the 13th Annual Smile Gala in New York City. On May 15, 2015, Vega attended the Latino Commission on AIDS Cielo in New York City. On May 18, 2015, Vega attended the 30th annual AIDS Walk in New York. On May 27, 2015, Vega traveled to Macau, China, to attend the grand opening of Galaxy Macau and Broadway Macau.

On June 5, 2015, Vega traveled to Machala, Ecuador, to attend the Annual 'Fiestas Machala' Parade. Vega received a certificate from Mayor Carlos Falquez Aguilar and the city of Machala for her visit. Vega also met with Mayor of Guayaquil Jaime Nebot during her trip. On June 27, 2015, Vega traveled to Almaty, Kazakhstan, to attend the VII Opera Ball and serve as Master of Ceremony.

On July 12, 2015, Vega traveled to Baton Rouge, Louisiana, to attend the 2015 Miss USA pageant. Vega assisted in crowning the winner, Olivia Jordan of Oklahoma. On July 20, 2015, Vega attended the Pixels New York premiere. On July 23, 2015, Vega volunteered at Gay Men's Health Crisis serving meals to men and women living with HIV and AIDS. On July 27, 2015, Vega participated in the Colombian Day parade in New York City. On July 28, 2015, Vega modeled for the pasarela Falabella Colombia Moda 2015, in Medellín, Colombia.

On August 4, 2015, Vega traveled to Mumbai, India, to launch the Jealous 21 Limited Edition Miss Universe Collection. On August 22, 2015, Vega traveled to Nassau, Bahamas, to attend Miss Teen USA 2015 held at the Atlantis Paradise Island. Vega assisted in crowning the winner Katherine Haik of Louisiana. On August 25, 2015, Vega attended the New York Yankees vs Houston Astros game at Yankee Stadium in New York City. On August 26, 2015, Vega spent a day volunteering with God's Love We Deliver, helping to prepare meals in New York City. On August 27, 2015, Vega attended the Ride of Fame city sightseeing cruise to the Statue of Liberty.

In early September 2015, Vega attended the U.S. Open. On September 8, 2015, Vega attended Colombia vs Peru international friendly match at Red Bull Arena in Harrison, New Jersey. From September 10 to 16, 2015, Vega attended Spring 2016 New York Fashion Week. Among others, she attended Angel Sanchez Show, Concept Korea Show, Axe and Esquire Show, Zang Toi Show, Nicholas K Show. Vega also attended Shenzhen Show, Sherri Hill Show, and the Australian Evening & Bridal Wear Show. On September 11, 2015, Vega attended Annual Charity Day hosted by Cantor Fitzgerald and BGC at BGC Partners, INC in New York City. On September 28, 2015, Vega attended the Fashion 4 Development's 5th annual Official First Ladies luncheon at The Pierre Hotel in New York City. It was also around this time during her reign Donald Trump acquired full ownership of the Miss Universe Organization and sold the entire company, ending his affiliation with the pageant.

On October 11, 2015, Vega led the annual Hispanic Day Parade up Fifth Avenue in New York City. From October 14 to 17, 2015, Vega attended various events in Colombia, among them, Miss Universe Cover Party Latino Show Magazine 2015 in Medellin and Pereira. On October 23, 2015, Vega attended the 11th Annual Orphaned Starfish Foundation's New York Gala at Cipriani Wall Street in New York City.

On November 3, 2015, Vega attended the 2015 Aid for AIDS Gala at Cipriani Downtown in New York City. On November 16, 2015, Vega attended the 2015 Miss Colombia pageant in Cartagena, Colombia. On November 18, 2015, Vega attended the 2015 Latin GRAMMY Person of the Year honoring Roberto Carlos at the Mandalay Bay Events Center in Las Vegas, Nevada.

On December 10, 2015, Vega and the 2015 Miss Universe contestants participated in the traditional National Gift Auction held at the Opportunity Village in Las Vegas, Nevada. On December 20, 2015, Vega crowned her successor Pia Wurtzbach of the Philippines at Planet Hollywood in Las Vegas, Nevada.

During her reign as Miss Universe, Vega traveled to The Bahamas, Canada, Chile, Colombia, Kazakhstan, Ecuador, France, India, Indonesia, Italy, and various cities and states around the United States.

Television

TV Shows

Notes

References

External links

 Official Paulina Vega website

1993 births
Living people
Miss Universe 2014 contestants
Miss Colombia winners
Miss Universe winners
People from Barranquilla
Colombian beauty pageant winners
Colombian female models